Grand Isle State Park, lies at the eastern tip of Grand Isle, a barrier island in Jefferson Parish, Louisiana, U.S.A. Grand Isle is the only inhabited barrier island in the state.

The park has been seriously affected in the past by Hurricanes Katrina, Gustav, and Ike. However, much of Grand Isle State Park has been renovated. Beach restoration in the area is ongoing.

The area has a long-standing reputation as one of America's best fishing spots with access to over 300 species of fish. At one time, the park's fishing pier was especially popular, but it was destroyed in 2005 by Hurricane Katrina and had to be repaired. An observation tower provides fine views of the surrounding coastal scenery. Visitors come to  Grand Isle State Park to beachcomb, birdwatch, boat, camp, crab, fish, and sunbathe.

The site is rumored to hold the buried treasure of famed 18th century privateers Jean and Pierre Lafitte whose operations were based at the neighboring Grand Terre Island across the Barataria Pass. The legend of the rougarou also is told as part of the area's history.

On May 22, 2010, the beach was closed due to oil contamination from the Deepwater Horizon oil spill. On May 3, 2011, a portion of the beach reopened. On June 26, 2011, volunteers, organized by the Coalition to Restore Coastal Louisiana, planted 1,600 black mangrove trees along the coast to prevent erosion.

It was named in 2020 to The New York Times' List of 52 Places to Go which noted that the site "may soon vanish" and faces one of the world’s highest rates of relative sea level rise.

See also
Grand Isle, Louisiana, town which shares the island with the state park
Bayou Segnette State Park
List of Louisiana state parks

References

External links
Grand Isle State Park, including a map

Protected areas of Jefferson Parish, Louisiana
State parks of Louisiana